Hugo Waser (born 9 August 1936) is a Swiss rower who competed in the 1960 Summer Olympics, in the 1964 Summer Olympics, and in the 1968 Summer Olympics.

Waser was born in Stansstad. In 1960 Waser was eliminated in the repechage of the single sculls event. Four years later he was a crew member of the Swiss boat which finished eleventh in the coxed pair competition. At the 1968 Games he won the bronze medal with the Swiss boat in the coxed four competition.

References

External links
 

1936 births
Living people
Swiss male rowers
Olympic rowers of Switzerland
Rowers at the 1960 Summer Olympics
Rowers at the 1964 Summer Olympics
Rowers at the 1968 Summer Olympics
Olympic bronze medalists for Switzerland
Olympic medalists in rowing
World Rowing Championships medalists for Switzerland
Medalists at the 1968 Summer Olympics
European Rowing Championships medalists